British Business Bank plc (BBB) is a state-owned economic development bank established by the UK Government. Its aim is to increase the supply of credit to small and medium enterprises (SMEs) as well as providing business advice services. It is structured as a public limited company and is owned by the Department for Business, Energy and Industrial Strategy (BEIS, formerly known as the Department of Business, Innovation and Skills or BIS). The bank has its headquarters in Sheffield.

History 
The intention to create a business bank was first announced by the Secretary of State for Business, Innovation and Skills, Vince Cable, in September 2012 with an initial £1 billion of government funding. The aim was to bring a number of government financial schemes, advice services and expertise together, creating a one stop shop for small and medium enterprises (SMEs) to go to. From 1 October 2013, Capital for Enterprise Limited (CfEL), BIS SME policy teams and private sector expertise were brought together within BIS to start the British Business Bank programme. On 2 December 2013 the Deputy Prime Minister, Nick Clegg, announced that the bank would be based in Sheffield, as well confirming an extra £250 million of government funding. On 15 October 2014, the bank was granted state aid clearance from the EU Commission and the programme was subsequently transferred from BIS to British Business Bank plc on 1 November 2014.

In 2018 the National Security Strategic Investment Fund (NSSIF) was created to provide long-term equity in advanced technologies relevant to national security, partly modeled on In-Q-Tel in the U.S. The UK intelligence and security agencies, led by the Secret Intelligence Service (MI6), will provide guidance to the investments. The kind of technologies previously developed within government have now often been commoditised and are produced in the private sector.

Operations 
The bank has taken on all financial schemes previously controlled by Capital for Enterprise Limited (CfEL), such as Enterprise Capital Funds, the Enterprise Finance Guarantee, Business Angel Co-investment Funds and the Small Firms Loan Guarantee. In addition, the bank ran the assessment process to select Bizfitech, Funding Xchange and Funding Options as designated finance platforms for the bank referral scheme.

The bank mainly targets its assistance to companies with a turnover of up to £25 million. The bank does not lend to SMEs directly, but instead works with other financial institutions to increase access to funding, such as by providing part-guarantees for loans.

The bank came under criticism from lender Rebuildingsociety.com in 2014 for its execution of the Funding for Lending scheme, saying it created unfair competition in the UK peer-to-peer lending industry by concentrating financial support via the largest platforms.

After the January 2018 liquidation of Carillion threatened thousands of suppliers, particularly SMEs, £100 million of lending was offered by the British Business Bank alongside a fund established by HSBC, Royal Bank of Scotland and Lloyds Bank.

In 2020 the NSSIF was involved in the British Government decision to invest £400 million for a 45% stake in OneWeb, a struggling low Earth orbit satellite communications business. It was reported that the UK would repurpose the satellites for the United Kingdom Global Navigation Satellite System, but by September 2020 that strategy was being reconsidered. The government's stake in OneWeb was diluted in July 2022 when the company was merged into French rival Eutelsat.

In February 2022 the bank launched its Sustainability Hub which aimed to alert smaller businesses to the commercial benefits of investing in decarbonisation. The Hub's resources include articles on topics such as creating action plans, sustainable logistics, and how to a build a green supply chain.

Future
Under her manifesto for the 2017 general election, Prime Minister Theresa May announced that the bank would take over from the European Investment Bank, after Brexit, receiving the UK funds hitherto earmarked for the European Investment Fund. The British Business Bank would open new offices in Edinburgh, Manchester, Birmingham, Cambridge, Newport, and Bristol.

References

External links 
 

British companies established in 2013
Department for Business, Energy and Industrial Strategy
Government-owned companies of the United Kingdom
Finance in the United Kingdom
Development finance institutions
Organisations based in Sheffield